Douglas Imrie (born 3 August 1983) is a Scottish football coach and former player, who is currently the manager of Greenock Morton.

Imrie played as either a forward or a winger in the professional leagues for Clyde, Inverness Caledonian Thistle, St Mirren, Greenock Morton and Hamilton Academical, having previously played in the Junior league for Lanark United.

Club career

Lanark United
Imrie was born in Lanark and came to prominence with local side Junior side Lanark United. He made 138 appearances for them, scoring 77 goals. He had previously played for amateur clubs Kirkfield United, Lanark Thistle and Symington Tinto.

Clyde
Imrie stepped up to the senior game when Graham Roberts signed him for Clyde in the January transfer window of 2006. He made his debut in the 5–0 victory over Stranraer in the Scottish First Division on 11 February 2006. Imrie's first goal for Clyde was a spectacular overhead volley from the edge of the area against Queen of the South in a 2–1 defeat on 4 March 2006. His next goal was also one to remember, as he scored the winner against Dundee at Dens Park when his cross was deflected into the net.

On 5 August 2006, Imrie signed a new contract, keeping him at Clyde until 2008. In September 2006, Imrie was involved in a collision with Hamilton Academical player Ross McCabe, in which Imrie jumped out of the way of McCabe's tackle and landed awkwardly on McCabe's neck. McCabe needed emergency assistance on the pitch, and had to retire from football as a result of an underlying heart condition that doctors discovered whilst treating him for the injury sustained in the accident.

Imrie's last Clyde goal was scored in his final game, in a 3–2 defeat against rivals Hamilton Academical on 26 January 2008. The goal was a free kick from 25 yards out.

Inverness Caledonian Thistle
On 31 January 2008 he signed a two and half-year deal with Inverness Caledonian Thistle moving for a transfer fee of £45,000, depending on appearances. He made his debut for the club on 9 February 2008 in a 1–1 draw with St Mirren. Imrie settled in fairly well at "Caley Thistle" and registered two assists in a game against Gretna on 5 April 2008. and scored his first goal in the following match, a free kick in a 3–0 home win against Kilmarnock on 19 April 2008. He made his last appearance for Caley in a 1–0 win against Airdrie United.

Hamilton Academical
Imrie signed for Hamilton Academical for close to £25,000 on 1 February 2010 and he made his debut in the Lanarkshire derby with Motherwell on 6 February. He signed a new two-year contract on 13 July 2010. He won the BBC Sportsound Player of the Year in 2009–10 for accumulating the most man-of-the-matches performances throughout the SPL season, despite only joining Accies in February.

In the first month after Hamilton's relegation from the Scottish Premier League, Imrie won the SFL Player of the Month award for August 2011. On 12 January 2012, Dundee United made an offer of £25,000 to Hamilton for Imrie, which was rejected.

St Mirren
St Mirren had a bid accepted for the player on 19 January 2012 of £35,000 and Imrie signed for the Paisley club on a two-and-a-half-year contract. His first appearance came two days later, in a 2–0 home defeat against Celtic. He scored his first goal for the club on 24 November 2012, as St Mirren beat Dundee 3–1.

On 29 May 2013, Imrie's contract with St Mirren was terminated by mutual consent.

Morton
Imrie left "Saints" to sign for local rivals Greenock Morton in July 2013. He scored his first goal for Morton in a 6–2 Scottish League Cup win over East Fife. He scored again in the League Cup, against Celtic in the 3rd round, from the penalty spot on 24 September 2013, as Morton won 1–0 at Celtic Park.

He left Morton after they were relegated to League One despite an offer of a contract extension.

Hamilton Academical (second spell)
Imrie re-signed with Hamilton in June 2014. He scored on his second debut for the club as Hamilton beat Arbroath 2–1 in the first round of the League Cup on 2 August 2014. In January 2015, when teammate Martin Canning became Accies player-manager, Imrie was invited to take up a role coaching the club's youth teams. In April 2015, he signed a new contract with the club until summer 2016, and in January 2016 he agreed another new contract until summer 2017. In December 2017, Imrie signed a contract extension with Hamilton until May 2019. In June 2018, the Under-17 team he coached (along with Darian MacKinnon) became Scottish champions in the age group, qualifying for the UEFA Youth League. In July 2018, he became the club captain. Imrie retired from playing football at the end of the 2018/19 season.

Coaching career 

In May 2021, Imrie was announced as the first-team coach and Head of Professional Programmes for Scottish Premiership side Livingston.

Greenock Morton 
Imrie was appointed manager of Greenock Morton in December 2021. Imrie only lost three games out of his opening 12 and in his first two full months as manager he won Championship manager of the month for January and February.

Career statistics

Managerial statistics

Honours 
 Lanark United
Evening Times Cup: 2004–05
Clydesdale Cup: Runner-up 2019–20

 Inverness Caledonian Thistle
Scottish First Division: 2009–10
Scottish Challenge Cup: Runner-up 2009–10

 St Mirren
Renfrewshire Cup: 2012–13

 Greenock Morton
Renfrewshire Cup: 2013–14

 Hamilton Academical
Scottish Premiership Play-offs: 2016–17

References

External links

1983 births
Living people
Scottish footballers
Clyde F.C. players
Inverness Caledonian Thistle F.C. players
Hamilton Academical F.C. players
Scottish Football League players
Scottish Premier League players
Scottish Junior Football Association players
St Mirren F.C. players
Association football forwards
Sportspeople from Lanark
Greenock Morton F.C. players
Scottish Professional Football League players
Hamilton Academical F.C. non-playing staff
Livingston F.C. non-playing staff
Scottish football managers
Scottish Professional Football League managers
Greenock Morton F.C. managers
Footballers from South Lanarkshire